Mohamed Saad Mubarak (born 4 April 1949) is a Kuwaiti former sprinter. He competed in the men's 400 metres at the 1972 Summer Olympics.

References

External links
 

1949 births
Living people
Athletes (track and field) at the 1972 Summer Olympics
Kuwaiti male sprinters
Olympic athletes of Kuwait
Place of birth missing (living people)